United Nations Security Council Resolution 308 was adopted on January 19, 1972, after a request by the Organisation of African Unity to hold meetings of the Council in an African capital. The Council decided to hold meetings in Addis Ababa from January 28 to a date no later than February 4.  The Council expressed its gratitude to Ethiopia for its promises for host the meetings and to provide certain facilities without cost.

The President of the Council announced the resolution was approved unanimously in the absence of any objection.

In accordance with the resolution, the Council's 1627th to 1638th meetings were held in the Ethiopian capital, to discuss several issues relating to peace and security in Africa.

See also
 List of United Nations Security Council Resolutions 301 to 400 (1971–1976)

References

External links
 
Text of the Resolution at undocs.org

 0308
1972 in Africa
History of Addis Ababa
 0308
January 1972 events